Ōmandokoro (大政所, 1516 – 29 August 1592) or Ōmandokoro Naka was the mother of the Japanese ruler Toyotomi Hideyoshi. She was also the mother of Asahi no kata, Tomo and Toyotomi Hidenaga.

Biography 
It is said that Ōmandokoro was born in Gokisu-mura, Owari Province. She was married to Kinoshita Yaemon, an Ashigaru of the Oda clan. They had two sons, Tomo and Hideyoshi. She remarried when her husband died. There is some controversy whether Asahi no kata and Hidenaga were the children of her first or second husband.

There are several accounts describing her role in Hideyoshi's court. One source cited that due to her serious illness in 1588, Hideyoshi ordered ceremonies at major Shinto and Buddhist temples at Ise, Kasuga, Gion, Atago, Kitano, Kiyomizudera, Kofukuji, and Kuramadera. In 1591, she pleaded clemency for three senior Daitokuji abbots, who Hideyoshi intended to crucify.

Ōmandokoro and her daughter Asahi were also sent as hostages in 1586 to Tokugawa Ieyasu when Hideyoshi summoned him to Osaka upon his promotion to the rank of Gon-Chunagon. This event showed that she was not very well known by her captors. One of the warriors, Honda Sakuzaemon Shigetsugu, was said to have advised Ieyasu: "You have to be careful, my lord, for there are a lot of elderly ladies-in-waiting about the Court, and Hideyoshi may quite likely have picked out one of them and sent her as substitute for his mother."

She died in 1592. After her death, she received the Buddhist name Tenzui'in (天瑞院).

Descendants

Imperial family 

 Naka (Omandokoro)
 Tomoko (Tomo)
 Toyotomi Hidekatsu
 Toyotomi Sadako
 Michifusa
 Machihime
 Sukemi
 Yukinori
 Nijo Munemoto
 Harutaka
 Kujo Hisatada
 Michitaka
 Setsuko (Empress Teimei: Empress of Emperor Taisho)
 Showa Emperor

Works in which Ōmandokoro appeared 

 Films
 "The Kiyosu Conference" (2013, Toho, Director: Kōki Mitani, Performance: Keiko Toda)
 TV dramas
 "Taikoki" (1965, NHK Taiga Drama, Performed by: Chieko Naniwa)
 "Youth Taikoki Look Now!" (1970, NTV, performed by Michiko Nakahata)
 "Shinsho Taikōki" (1973, TV Asahi, acting: Sadako Sawamura)
 "Onna Taikoki" (1981, NHK Taiga Drama, Performed by Harue Akagi)
 "Tokugawa Ieyasu" (1983, NHK Taiga Drama, Performed by Mitsue Suzuki)
 "Taikoki" (1987, TBS Grand Historical Play Special, performed by Yasuyo Matsumura)
 "Hidekichi Toyomi, the man who captured the world" (1993, TBS Grand Historical Play Special, Performance: Kin Sugai)
 "Toyoomi Hidekichi captures the world!" (1995, TV TOKYO 12 hours super wide drama, performance: Jun Miho → Tamao Nakamura)
 "Hideyoshi" (1996, NHK Taiga drama, performance: Etsuko Ichihara)
 "Toshiie to Matsu-Kaga Hyakumangoku Monogatari" (2002, NHK Taiga Drama, Performed by Mitsuko Kusabue)
 "Taikoki-Hidekichi, the man who captured the world" (2006, TV Asahi, performance: Hideko Yoshida)
 "Kirin comes" (2020, NHK Taiga Drama Performance: Ginpuncho)

Honours
Junior First Rank (11 July 1585)

See also 
 Midaidokoro

References

1516 births
1592 deaths
16th-century Japanese women
People of Sengoku-period Japan
Toyotomi clan